Geoff Phelps was an Australian rules footballer for the Port Adelaide Football Club in the South Australian National Football League.

References

Port Adelaide Football Club (SANFL) players
Port Adelaide Football Club players (all competitions)
Living people
Year of birth missing (living people)